Bellahouston railway station was a railway station serving the Bellahouston area of Glasgow, Scotland. The station was originally part of the G&SWR Paisley Canal Branch.

History
The station opened on 1 July 1885 and was closed to regular passenger traffic from 1 January 1917 although remaining open for workmen's traffic. It had fully reopened by mid-1920 and was closed to passengers by the British Transport Commission on 20 September 1954. 

Today, part of the line is still operating as the Paisley Canal Line; and a new railway station, Dumbreck, was opened near to the site of Bellahouston station on 28 July 1990.

Sources

References

Disused railway stations in Glasgow
Former Glasgow and South Western Railway stations
Railway stations in Great Britain opened in 1885
Railway stations in Great Britain closed in 1954